Iribarne is Basque place name and surname. Notable people with the surname include:

 Alberto Iribarne (born 1950), Argentine politician
 Francisco Iribarne (born 1998), Spanish volleyball player
 Louis Iribarne, translator from Polish into English
 Manuel Fraga Iribarne (1922−2012), Spanish politician
 Simone Iribarne Lafargue, French tennis player
 Juan Ignacio Iribarne, Argentine Tester and dancer